Helmut Graeb is an electrical engineer at the Technical University of Munich, Germany. Graeb was named a Fellow of the Institute of Electrical and Electronics Engineers (IEEE) in 2014 for his contributions to design centering and structural analysis of analog circuits.

References 

Fellow Members of the IEEE
Living people
Year of birth missing (living people)
Place of birth missing (living people)
Academic staff of the Technical University of Munich